The Odyssey Complex, formerly Odyssey Centre, is a sports and entertainment complex located within the Titanic Quarter in Belfast, Northern Ireland.

The complex originated in 1992 and came into fruition in June 1998. It opened in December 2000, with expansions opening in March and May 2001. The complex consists of: a multipurpose arena, science centre and shopping centre. The shopping centre houses a Cineworld cinema and Hollywood Bowl, alongside a selection of restaurants.

History

The Odyssey Centre was 50% funded by a £45m grant from the Millennium Commission as part of the Landmark Project for Northern Ireland, with matched funding from the Department of Education for Northern Ireland, the Sheridan Group and the Sports Council for Northern Ireland. The application to the Millennium Commission was led by the Ulster Museum, who wished to develop a science centre and teamed up with Peter Curistan, who wished to develop an IMAX, and then led the development of the Arena with L&R leisure who were the consultants. The name "Odyssey", was to symbolise the 'journey of discovery' that would be the science centre and Michael Montgomery, a young 14-year-old at the time, came up with the name. The complex adopted the name, and the Science Centre became W5.

The arena opened in 2000, W5 on 31 March 2001 with the Pavilion opening a few months later. The Odyssey is quoted to have cost £120 million on completion. Odyssey was held in Trust by the Odyssey Trust Company with leases to SMG/Sheridan for the Arena, Sheridan for the Pavilion and National Museums NI for W5. In 2011, Odyssey Trust took over the Arena. In 2011, the Odyssey Pavilion, which was owned by The Sheridan Group, went into administration, and the building went under the control of KPMG temporarily until the energy company, SSE, purchased it. It is managed by The Odyssey Trust.

Facilities

SSE Arena, Belfast

Formerly the Odyssey Arena from 2000 to 2015. Northern Ireland's biggest indoor arena, with a capacity of 11,000+ for concerts, hosts concerts and sporting events such as Belfast Giants games. On 25 June 2015, it was announced the Arena would undergo a £3 million refurbishment and become the SSE Arena on 4 September 2015. The naming rights will last for 10 years.

Sports

Since opening, the SSE Arena has been the home to the UK's Elite Ice Hockey League team, the Belfast Giants. The Belfast Giants play weekly home games against teams from across the U.K. between September and March of each year. On 2 October 2010, the Boston Bruins faced the Belfast Giants 'Selects' in an NHL Challenge match.

The venue also hosts a number of live sporting events including WWE who brings superstars from WWE Raw and WWE Smackdown brands so wrestling fans are able to watch their favourites perform live.  On 16 June 2007, the SSE Arena hosted the UFC 72: Victory as they continued their expansion into Europe where the live events were broadcast on pay-per-view in North America, the United Kingdom and Ireland.

World Champion Boxer Carl Frampton has also fought at the SSE Arena.  His first fight at the venue was in 2010 when he won the Commonwealth super-bantamweight title by a fourth-round TKO stoppage against Mark Quon. Carl Frampton has continued to fight in the SSE Arena, Belfast up until 2018 and helped promote Northern Ireland by using it as the venue for his matches

Since 2008, the venue has also played host to the Premier League Darts.

Odyssey Pavilion

The Odyssey Pavilion was once home to a thriving nightlife including bars, nightclubs and restaurants.  Notable examples include Rockies Sports Bar, Bar 7, Box Nightclub and Beach Nightclub. Several food companies were situated in The Pavilion including Soda Joes, Red Panda, La Tasca and The Streat Cafe alongside two well-known food chains including Northern Ireland's own Indian Ocean restaurants and Pizza Hut.

Formerly known as the Odyssey Pavilion, the Odyssey will house multiple shops, restaurants, cafes, entertainment venues and leisure facilities. The major redevelopment of the Odyssey sees two new major companies entering the space. The previous Odyssey Cinema's space will now be home to world's second largest cinema chain Cineworld who will be redeveloping and entering the space of the previous Sheridan IMAX cinema. The Odyssey Bowl home to arcade games, bowling alleys and a restaurant will re-launch itself after being purchased by the UK's best ten pin bowling alley, the Hollywood Bowl Group, while Zizzi, Nando's and Five Guys will open restaurants in the pavilion, it is Cineworld and Hollywood Bowl's first ventures in Northern Ireland.

W5

W5 stands for "Who, What, Where, When, Why".  W5 was developed by Sally Montgomery, the Ulster Museum's project director (and then founding CEO) with the exhibitions being designed by Hands On Inc, Florida, United States, and Ontario Science Centre, Canada. W5 has roughly 250 interactive exhibits, along with 6 themed exhibitions, in 3500 square metres of exhibition space, workshop space and lecture theatre.

W5 was a wholly owned subsidiary of the National Museums Northern Ireland until 31 March 2012 when it became a subsidiary of Odyssey Trust.  W5 has won a number of awards, including Best Visitor Attraction, several times. In 2013, W5 opened 'Climbit', the biggest Luckey Climber in Europe where small children can climb up twelve metres in total safety.

Future
In October 2009, The Odyssey Trust sought planning permission for a £100m extension plan. The plans include 800 residential units, two hotels, a promenade, shops, additional leisure facilities and a multi-storey car park.

On 29 November 2013, the owners of the Odyssey won planning permission for an extension to include hotels, shops and apartments creating around 1,000 new jobs. Work is due to start immediately, with around 800 people set to work on construction of the scheme – described as the biggest redevelopment in Belfast in years. Odyssey Trust's plan is to build next to the existing Odyssey Arena and Pavilion as part of the restart of the Belfast master plan.

In October 2017, it was announced that Planning Permission had been submitted to transform the Complex in a £10m refurbishment. Plans include a new entrance to the Odyssey Pavilion, upgrade of Public Realm and reconfiguration of existing retail units. Phase two will see improved visitor access and greater use of the central open space.

Awards
In 2006, the Odyssey Arena was short-listed for 'International Large Venue of the Year' (Over 8,000 seats) Outside of North America.  This took place at the 17th Annual Pollstar Awards in 2006.  This short-listing made the Odyssey Arena one of the top six major concert venues in the world.

The SSE Arena, Belfast, has won the ‘App of The Year’ at the 2017 DANI (Digital Advertising Northern Ireland) Awards.

Transport
The SSE Arena, Belfast is located in the Titanic Quarter of Belfast, Northern Ireland. If you are visiting the arena, it is a 15-minute walk from the City Centre of Belfast over the Lagan Weir and Queen Elizabeth Bridges.

Visitors are also able to access the SSE Arena in many ways thanks to the services provided by Translink NI. Glider (Belfast) is the newest way to access the arena from the city centre. The Glider Bus route 'G2' travels from the city centre to the Odyssey bus stop which allows users to depart right outside of the venue.  Metro (Belfast) service '94' takes users from Donegall Square North, just outside the Visit Belfast Welcome Centre to the venue with stops immediately outside.

The Titanic Quarter railway station is only a 10-minute walk away from the Arena and Titanic Belfast visitor centre. Exiting the railway station you cross the bypass bridge and turn left on Sydenham Road where the Arena is situated.

References

External links

 SSE Arena, Belfast Official Website
 Odyssey Pavilion Official Website
 W5 Official Website

Buildings and structures completed in 2001
Music venues completed in 2001
Sports venues completed in 2001
Indoor ice hockey venues in the United Kingdom
Buildings and structures in Belfast
Indoor arenas in Northern Ireland
Music venues in Belfast
Buildings and structures celebrating the third millennium
Concert halls in Northern Ireland
2001 establishments in Northern Ireland
Darts venues
21st-century architecture in Northern Ireland